Kotzschmar may refer to:

 Cyrus Hermann Kotzschmar Curtis, an American publisher who was named after Hermann Kotzschmar
 Hermann Kotzschmar, a German-American musician
 Kotzschmar Memorial Organ, a pipe organ located in Portland, Maine